KUNC (91.5 FM) is a radio station broadcasting a News/Talk public radio format. Licensed to Greeley, Colorado, United States, it serves Northern Colorado, including Fort Collins and Greeley. The station is owned and operated by Community Radio for Northern Colorado, a 501(c)(3) non-profit organization.

History
KUNC began operations January 6, 1967 at the University of Northern Colorado as KCBL.  It became KUNC on May 1, 1970.

During the Fall of 2000, UNC put the station up for sale in an effort to save money.  Colorado Public Radio in Denver agreed to purchase the station; it had been looking to expand its offerings to Northern Colorado for some time.  However, an upwelling of support from the local Northern Colorado community as well as a concerted effort by staff at the station, targeted at "keeping community radio local," led to a fundraising effort which produced a counter-offer from the newly formed Community Radio for Northern Colorado.

On July 24, 2007, KUNC began transmitting from Buckhorn Mountain, northwest of Fort Collins. The new location widened the station's coverage to include most of the northern portion of metro Denver; under the right conditions, it can be heard in much of Denver itself.

Programming
KUNC broadcasts programming from National Public Radio, Public Radio International, the BBC, and other public radio producers, as well as locally produced news, commentary, and programming such as the daily talk show, Colorado Edition.

Translators

External links
Official KUNC website

UNC
Greeley, Colorado
NPR member stations
Radio stations established in 1967
1967 establishments in Colorado